Şebnem Sönmez (born 5 June 1968) is a Turkish theater, movie and television actress. She started her career playing in theater in the Istanbul Pendik Youth Theatre while still a high school student. She performed in groups such as Kartal Art Theatre and Taner Barlas Mim Theatre. After completing and having her diploma from Istanbul State Conservatory, she worked in Dormen Theatre. She then moved on to television roles as she continued her theater experience in Besiktas Cultural Center. She has also taught theater at the kindergarten through high school level and founded the "Yaz Tiyatrosu" (Summer Theatre) group in her school while she continued her acting work.

Acting career

Honors

References

External links 

Elveda Rumeli Fan Clubl

1968 births
Living people
Turkish film actresses
Turkish television actresses
Turkish stage actresses
20th-century Turkish actresses